Berberis swaseyi (Texas barberry) is a rare species of barberry endemic to the Edwards Plateau region of Texas. It grows in limestone ridges and canyons. The species is evergreen, with thick, rigid, 5-9-foliolate leaves. Berries are dry or juicy, white to red, about 9–16 mm in diam.

The compound leaves place this species in the group sometimes segregated as the genus Mahonia.

References

swaseyi
Endemic flora of Texas
Plants described in 1873
Flora without expected TNC conservation status